The University of Denver (DU) is a private research university in Denver, Colorado.  Founded in 1864, it is the oldest independent private university in the Rocky Mountain Region of the United States. It is classified among "R1: Doctoral Universities – very high research activity". DU enrolls approximately 5,700 undergraduate students and 7,200 graduate students.  The  main campus is a designated arboretum and is located primarily in the University Neighborhood, about five miles (8 km) south of downtown Denver. The 720-acre Kennedy Mountain Campus is located approximately 110 miles northwest of Denver, in Larimer County.

History 
 
In March 1864, John Evans, former Governor of the Colorado Territory, appointee of President Abraham Lincoln, founded the Colorado Seminary in the newly created (1858) city of Denver, which was then a mining camp. Evans, governor and superintendent of Indian affairs of the Colorado Territory, was partially culpable for the November 1864 Sand Creek massacre (which was carried out by Colonel John Chivington, later a member of the university's original board of directors). The school had originally been planned as the Denver Seminary, but the name was changed before the charter was secured.

At its founding the seminary was non-sectarian and operated by the Methodist Episcopal Church. It struggled in the early years of its existence. In 1880 it was renamed the University of Denver. The first buildings of the university were located in downtown Denver in the 1860s and 1870s, but concerns that Denver's rough-and-tumble frontier town atmosphere was not conducive to education prompted a relocation to the current campus, built on the donated land of potato farmer Rufus Clark, some seven miles (11 km) south of the downtown core. The university grew and prospered alongside the city's growth, appealing primarily to a regional student body prior to World War II. After the war, the large surge in G.I. Bill students pushed DU's enrollment to over 13,000 students, the largest the university has ever been, and helped to spread the university's reputation to a national audience.

Campus
 
The heart of the campus has a number of historic buildings. The longest-standing building is University Hall, which has served DU since 1890, and was built in the Richardsonian Romanesque style. The cornerstone to this building is exactly one mile above sea level. Just a few blocks off campus sits the historic Chamberlin Observatory, opened in 1894. Still a fully operational observatory, it is open to the public twice a week as well as one Saturday a month.

The central campus area also includes Evans Memorial Chapel, an 1870s-vintage small church which was once located in downtown Denver, and was relocated to the DU campus in the early 1960s. Buchtel Tower (1913) is all that remains of the former Buchtel Chapel, which burned in 1983.

The administrative offices are located in the Mary Reed Building, a former library built in 1932 in the Collegiate Gothic style.  Margery Reed Hall (named for the daughter of Mary Reed) was also built in the collegiate gothic style in 1929.  Margery Reed Hall houses the Undergraduate Program for the Daniels College of Business; an $8 million overhaul and renovation was completed early 2014. The building was updated to include more classroom space, a larger hall to host guest speakers, as well as mechanical and technical improvements.

F.W. Olin Hall opened in 1997, housing Biological and Natural Sciences.  The 40,000 square foot structure was the first building on campus constructed to meet a new set of design and aesthetic standards emphasizing load-bearing masonry, organic designs, and timeless architectural features. Olin Hall includes a two-story rotunda topped with an elliptical copper dome, a sentinel in the university skyline.

The Daniels College of Business was completed in September 1999 at the cost of $25 million. The business school has been nationally recognized by organizations such as Forbes magazine, Business Week, and the Wall Street Journal where it is ranked second in the nation for producing students with high ethical standards.

In 2002, the university opened the $70 million Robert and Judi Newman Center for Performing Arts, which houses the acclaimed Lamont School of Music. The center includes the June Swaner Gates Concert Hall, a four-level opera house seating just under 1,000, the Frederic C. Hamilton Family Recital Hall, a 222-seat recital hall with the largest (2,850 pipes) "tracker" organ in the region, and the Elizabeth Ericksen Byron Theatre, a flexible theatre space seating up to 350. The Newman Center serves as home to many professional performing arts groups from the Denver region as well as the university's Newman Center Presents multi-disciplinary performing arts series.

Nelson Hall, opened in 2002, is a LEED residence hall housing sophomores in dorm- and apartment-style suites. Its castle-like design and gold leaf-topped tower anchors the south end of campus.

In autumn 2003, DU opened a new $63.5 million facility for its College of Law, later named the "Sturm College of Law." Donald and Susan Sturm, owners of Denver-based American National Bank, had given $20 million to the University of Denver College of Law. The gift is the largest single donation in the 112-year history of the law school and among the largest gifts ever to the university. The building includes a three-story library.

In 2005 the Graduate School of Social Work completed the renovation and significant expansion of its building, renamed Craig Hall. The building features extensive stained glass artwork and a large events space.

In January 2006, DU opened a new building for the School of Hotel, Restaurant, and Tourism Management (Fritz Knoebel School of Hospitality Management), later named the Joy Burns Center. The building contains classrooms, a large wine cellar, meeting rooms, and an all-purpose dining room that hosts numerous city and university events, weddings, and formal parties. The school helps DU rank near the top of all hotel schools in the United States. The program had its first graduating class in 1946.

Nagel Hall was completed in the Fall of 2008 to house sophomores and upperclassman, and offers a wide collection of art throughout the building donated by the Nagel family. In 2012, the building was certified Gold in LEED standards in recognition of its environmentally friendly and sustainable design. The building also houses offices for the Department of Psychology and a bike repair shop in its lower level.

DU completed the first ever (Peter S. Barton) lacrosse-only stadium that was specifically designed for the sport in 2005, as well as the Ciber Field Soccer Stadium (2010) on the northern end of campus, adjoining the Nagel studio space for the School of Art, as well as the Pat Bowlen varsity sports weight training facility underneath the stands.

The environmentally friendly $25 million Morgridge College of Education was opened in June 2010.

At the beginning of the summer of 2011, the 41-year-old Penrose Library closed for a $32 million renovation, and reopened in the Spring of 2013 as the Anderson Academic Commons, a 21st-century high-tech collaboration and study space - one of the most advanced and technologically capable libraries among universities throughout the country.

In May 2016, the 47,000 square foot Anna & John J. Sie International Relations Complex opened as an addition to Cherrington Hall. The addition rises five stories, and includes classrooms, offices, and an expansive event space and deck on the fifth floor. The building also features a blue-tiled tower prominent in the university's skyline.

In 2016, the university opened the 130,000 square foot Daniel Felix Ritchie School of Engineering and Computer Science on the southern end of campus, adjacent to Olin Hall. The building features classroom, laboratory, and office spaces for faculty, as well as a cafe on the first floor. The structure is notable for its zinc and limestone dome rising five floors above the main entrance.

In 2018, then-Chancellor Rebecca Chopp and university architect Mark Rodgers introduced the Denver Advantage Campus Framework Plan, which aimed to provide a path forward for the university's physical campus.

In September 2020, the Dimond Family Residential Village opened to house first-year students, and the Burwell Center for Career Achievement opened to house alumni engagement and career services offices, replacing the Leo Block Alumni Center. Both are on track to achieve LEED certification and are the first structures completed under the Denver Advantage Campus Framework Plan.

In January 2021, the new Community Commons opened to students, on the previous site of the Driscoll North student center. The building serves as a student union and houses the Rebecca Chopp Grand Central Market, the central campus dining hall. The building features a copper-clad exterior, a rooftop deck, and extensive suites for offices and student engagement.

The university has six residence halls, Johnson McFarlane Hall (JMac), Centennial Halls, Centennial Towers, Nelson Hall, Nagel Hall, and the Dimond Family Residential Village (DFRV). Johnson McFarlane Hall was energy star certified in September 2011 as one of the most energy efficient buildings on campus, and is the oldest co-ed dorm in the western United States.

The university developed a robust response to the COVID-19 pandemic, including weekly and bi-weekly saliva testing for undergraduates and faculty, staff and graduate students, respectively. Vaccine mandates, testing, contact tracing and masks are all helping keep transmission low on campus.

In October 2021, the establishment of the James C. Kennedy Mountain Campus was announced with a $26 million gift from a university alumnus.

Academics

Rankings

The undergraduate business program, The Daniels College of Business, was ranked 87th best in 2016 by BusinessWeek, and it was ranked the 71st best program by U.S. News in a 2008 ranking.

In a 2012 survey performed by the College of William and Mary and published by Foreign Policy Magazine, the Josef Korbel School of International Studies ranked 11th in the world for its graduate masters program, ahead of such schools as Syracuse, Yale, Stanford, University of California-Berkeley, Oxford and MIT.

Academic programs

Schools and colleges:
 College of Arts, Humanities & Social Sciences
 College of Natural Sciences & Mathematics
 Daniels College of Business
 Sturm College of Law
 University College
 Morgridge College of Education

 Graduate School of Professional Psychology
 Graduate School of Social Work
 Josef Korbel School of International Studies
 Lamont School of Music
 Daniel Felix Ritchie School of Engineering and Computer Science
Institutes and Centers:
 Institute for the Advancement of the American Legal System (IAALS) is a national, independent research center dedicated to facilitating continuous improvement and advancing excellence in the American legal system.
 Conflict Resolution Institute
 Intermodal Transportation Institute, established by Gil Carmichael, former head of the Federal Railroad Administration and former chairman of Amtrak
 Center for China-US Cooperation
 Crossley Center for Public Opinion Research
 Institute for Comparative and Regional Studies
 Scrivner Institute of Public Policy
 Sié Chéou-Kang Center for International Security and Diplomacy
 Center for Judaic Studies
 Edward W. & Charlotte A. Estlow International Center for Journalism and New Media
 Pardee Center for International Futures

Programs:
 Graduate Tax Program
 DU-Iliff Joint Doctoral Program in the Study of Religion (JDP)
 Graduate School of Social Work Doctoral Program
 Josef Korbel School of International Studies-Sturm College of Law Joint Program
 Daniels College of Business-Sturm College of Law Joint Program

Interdisciplinary programs:
Cognitive Neuroscience – (Psychology and Biology)
Video Game Design – (Computer Science and Emergent Digital Practices)
International Intercultural Communication M.A. (International Studies and Media, Film and Journalism Studies)

Students in the graduate programs represent over half of the total enrollment of the school.

Aside from the Sturm College of Law, the university operates on a quarter system, sometimes known as trimester academic calendar, in which an academic year is divided into three academic quarters lasting 10 weeks per each quarter. This academic system allows students to take more classes each year than students in a more traditional 15-week semester system.

Offering students a learning experience abroad, the Cherrington Global Scholars program offers every undergraduate the chance to study abroad at no cost above the normal university tuition, room and board.

, the Daniels School of Business also offers an online MBA program.

Study abroad program 
In the 2017–18 academic year, DU had a 77.5 percent of participation leading them to be third in national rank. The director of the Office of International Education, Denise Cop, acknowledged that there is an increase in cultural self-awareness and knowledge of cultural worldview frameworks of the students that go study abroad. The top destinations of DU students are United Kingdom, Spain and Italy, however many students go to universities in Australia, New Zealand and Scotland. DU's Office of International Education also offers to their students support and advice for all undergraduate students who want to study abroad.

Magazine 
The University of Denver Magazine is published four times a year, in fall, winter, spring, and summer.

The Denver Quarterly was founded in 1966 by novelist John Edward Williams. The Denver Quarterly is published jointly by the Department of English & Literary Arts at the University of Denver. The Denver Quarterly has published poems by many poets, including Dobby Gibson, Seyed Morteza Hamidzadeh, Emily Fragos, Donna L. Emerson, Heather Hughes, L. S. Klatt, and Victoria McArtor.

Student life 
Fraternities and sororities at the university include:

Athletics

DU's athletic teams are known as the Denver Pioneers. The school has been fielding athletic teams since 1867, winning 33 NCAA Division One titles since 1949—among the top 15 of all schools. Denver is best known as a major power in winter sports, in particular, skiing and ice hockey. DU has won 24 NCAA national team skiing championships (more than any other school). Ice hockey is DU's flagship spectator sport, with nine NCAA titles (tied for first among all schools), most recently in 2022 and including back-to-back crowns in 2004 and 2005.  The program has produced 75 NHL players and regularly sells out the 6,000 seat Magness Arena on campus, the showpiece of the Ritchie Center for Sports and Wellness.

The Pioneers' major conference affiliations changed in July 2013. Denver moved its primary affiliation from the Western Athletic Conference to The Summit League, hockey moved from the Western Collegiate Hockey Association to the National Collegiate Hockey Conference, and men's lacrosse moved from the ECAC Lacrosse League to the Big East Conference. The women's lacrosse team also moved from the Mountain Pacific Sports Federation (MPSF) to the Big East Conference in 2017 and in 2019 they reached the Elite 8 (quarterfinals) of the NCAA tournament. In addition, the women's gymnastics team joined the newly formed Mountain Rim Gymnastics Conference in 2013 and later moved to the Big 12 Conference in July 2015.

The Pioneers won the national championship in men's lacrosse in 2015, beating Maryland, 10–5. They were the first Division I men's team west of the Appalachians to win a men's lacrosse NCAA national championship. The 2016 men's soccer team advanced to the NCAA College Cup.

The school has identified itself as the Pioneers since 1925. Previous mascots were Pioneer Pete (1920s to 1968), Denver Boone (1968 to 1998), and Ruckus the red-tailed hawk (1998 to 2007). A 2013 task force generated three new mascot options, but none of them carried enough votes from the university community to merit selection.

Notable alumni and faculty

Faculty
 Robert Davine (Professor of Accordion and Music Theory, 1924–2001) - established one of the three major academic programs at the college level within the United States for the accordion as part of a course of study culminating in an Artist Diploma in Concert Accordion Performance at the university's Lamont School of Music in the late 1950s.

See also 
List of University of Denver chancellors

References

External links

 
 University of Denver Athletics website

 
Universities and colleges in Denver
University of Denver
Educational institutions established in 1864
1864 establishments in Colorado Territory